Rémy Bricka (born April 10, 1949 in Niederbronn-les-Bains, Bas-Rhin) is a French musician, one-man band, and singer.  He became the first person to walk across the Atlantic Ocean, in 1988, using floating skis to walk on water.

His most successful album is La Vie en couleur, and in 1977 that song of his became a number five hit in France.  The single Elle dit bleu elle dit rose sold 250,000 copies.

Along with the French versions, he released German versions of Petite fille du roi and Chanter la vie.  In May 2008, Bricka appeared with Julien Doré in his single Les limites.

Aquatic pedestrianism
Between April 2 and May 31, 1988 he crossed the Atlantic on floating skis, propelled by a pair of oars.
He attempted to cross the Pacific (between Los Angeles and Sydney) by the same method.  He started out on April 24, 2000, but failed, and he was recovered south of Hawaii on September 25 after five months of travel.
A book was published in 1990 on his earlier adventure: L’Homme qui marche sur l’eau (The Man who Walks on Water).

Discography

Singles
Tagada
1972: Pour un dollar pour un penny (written by Serge Prisset and Jim Larriaga)
1974: Le Pantin
1976: La Vie en couleur (written by Guy Floriant and Nicolas Skorsky)
1977: Ah ! Quelle famille (Floriant and Skorsky)
1977: Elle dit bleu, elle dit rose (Floriant and Skorsky)
1977: Petite fille du roi (written by Rémy Bricka)
1977: Ta Maison dans les fleurs
1978: Chantons Noël
1979: Le Bon Dieu m'a dit 
1979: Ok ! Pour un chien ! 
1985: Chanter la vie (written by Philippe David and Lisa-Sylvie Bellec)
1999: Marcher sur l'eau  (written by Philippe Laumont and Skorsky)

Albums

La Vie en couleur
La Vie en couleur
Pas de problème
Marcher sur l'eau
Ta Maison dans les fleurs
Le Bonheur n'est jamais loin
Marylène
Ma Petite Sirène
Le Temps passe si vite
Elle dit bleu, elle dit rose
Libera
Ah ! Quelle famille
"Libera" and "marcher sur l'eau" were not part of the original 1978 release.  They replaced Si aujourd'hui tu m'abandonnes and Chanson pour un bagarre on the 2000 or 2002 reissue.

Marcher sur l'eau
Released on October 30, 2000
Marcher sur l'eau
Pas de problème
La Vie en couleur
Ta Maison dans les fleurs
Ma Petite Sirène
Marylène
Le Bonheur n'est jamais loin
Le Temps passe si vite
Elle dit bleu, elle dit rose
Libera
Ah ! Quelle famille
Marcher sur l'eau (instrumental)

References

External links 
 http://www.remybricka.com/
 http://www.bide-et-musique.com/artist/310.html
 http://www.stars-oubliees.com/les_inclassables/remy_bricka/rubrique57.html
 http://www.myspace.com/remybricka

1949 births
Living people
People from Bas-Rhin
French male singers
One-man bands